Shri Dattatreya Akhara or Datta Akhara is a Hindu Monastery, located in Ujjain on the very place where Lord Dattatreya taught his disciples in Treta Yuga.

Address
Dattatreya Akhara Ghat, Kshipra Tat, Opposite Ram Ghat, Ujjain 456006, Madhya Pradesh, India

See the map

History

The history of Guru Dattatreya Akhara dates back at least to AdiGuru Shankaracharya. The Guru-disciple tradition goes back from AdiGuru Shankaracharya to Govindapadacharya, Gaudapadacharya, Shukadeva, Sage Vyasa, Sage Parashara, Shakti Maharishi, Sage Vasishtha, and Lord Brahma. More details are on this page.

External links 
 Dattatreya Akhara's Internet site: www.datta-akhara.org (not available these days)
 Dattatreya Akhara's Facebook page: https://www.facebook.com/DattAkharaUjjain
 Dattatreya Akhara, Ujjain, Location Map
 Dattatreya Akhara's older pages - use these for the time being.

Hindu monasteries in India
Religion in Madhya Pradesh
Buildings and structures in Ujjain
Religion in Ujjain
Tourist attractions in Ujjain